Chionodes nubilella is a moth of the family Gelechiidae. It is found in Scandinavia and northern Russia.

The wingspan is 16–19 mm. Adults have been recorded on wing from June to August.

References

Moths described in 1839
Chionodes
Moths of Europe